Munir Ahmad Kakar (born 1 February 1996) is an Afghan cricketer. He made his international debut for the Afghanistan cricket team in March 2021.

Domestic career
He made his List A debut for Amo Region in the 2017 Ghazi Amanullah Khan Regional One Day Tournament on 10 August 2017. He made his Twenty20 debut for Boost Defenders in the 2017 Shpageeza Cricket League on 15 September 2017. He made his first-class debut for Boost Region in the 2017–18 Ahmad Shah Abdali 4-day Tournament on 26 October 2017.

He was the leading run-scorer for Boost Region in the 2018 Ahmad Shah Abdali 4-day Tournament, with 843 runs in ten matches. He was also the leading run-scorer for Boost Region in the 2018 Ghazi Amanullah Khan Regional One Day Tournament, with 256 runs in six matches. In the final of the Ghazi Amanullah Khan Regional One Day Tournament, he scored 108 not out, leading Boost Region to a five wicket win, and was named the man of the match.

He was the leading run-scorer in the 2019 Afghanistan Provincial Challenge Cup, with 348 runs in four matches. In September 2019, he was the leading run-scorer in the 2019 Ghazi Amanullah Khan Regional One Day Tournament, with 414 runs in six matches.

International career
In September 2018, he was named in Afghanistan's One Day International (ODI) squad for the 2018 Asia Cup, but he did not play. In November 2019, he was named in Afghanistan's squad for the 2019 ACC Emerging Teams Asia Cup in Bangladesh.

In February 2021, he was named in Afghanistan's Test squad for their series against Zimbabwe. He made his Test debut for Afghanistan, against Zimbabwe, on 2 March 2021.

References

External links
 

1996 births
Living people
Afghan cricketers
Afghanistan Test cricketers
Amo Sharks cricketers
Boost Defenders cricketers
Place of birth missing (living people)